is an action role-playing game for the Game Boy released in 1993 by Culture Brain. It is the second game for the Game Boy in the Super Chinese series. Unlike the first Ninja Boy, Ninja Boy II features role-playing video game elements, similar to Super Chinese 2.

Summary
In the previous game, the world has been saved and an intergalactic conference has been called. Alien invaders came in and kidnapped all the dignitaries; declaring themselves to be the rulers of the entire galaxy in the process. Several alien leaders became lieutenants in order to make the claim look legitimate. Ninja warriors Jack and Ryu must help the people of Futureland defeat the alien overlords by creating a spaceship from scratch. Despite their intentions, Ryu and Jack must land at all the planets in order to repair the spaceship.

References

Role-playing video games
Culture Brain games
Game Boy games
Game Boy-only games
Super Chinese
Action role-playing video games
1993 video games
Video games about ninja
Video games developed in Japan
Multiplayer and single-player video games